Gregg Leonard Semenza (born July 12, 1956) is a Pediatrician and Professor of Genetic Medicine at the Johns Hopkins School of Medicine. He serves as the director of the vascular program at the Institute for Cell Engineering. He is a 2016 recipient of the Albert Lasker Award for Basic Medical Research. He is known for his discovery of HIF-1, which allows cancer cells to adapt to oxygen-poor environments. He shared the 2019 Nobel Prize in Physiology or Medicine  for "discoveries of how cells sense and adapt to oxygen availability" with William Kaelin Jr. and Peter J. Ratcliffe.

Early life 
Semenza was born on July 12, 1956, in Flushing, New York City; he and his four siblings grew up in Westchester County, New York.

Education and career 
Semenza grew up in Westchester County, New York and attended Washington Irving Intermediate School in Tarrytown, New York. He then attended Sleepy Hollow High School where he was a mid-fielder on the soccer team and graduated in 1974.  As an undergraduate at Harvard University, he studied medical genetics and mapped genes on chromosome 21. For his PhD at the University of Pennsylvania, he sequenced genes linked to the recessive genetic disorder, beta-thalassemia. Semenza subsequently completed his Pediatrics residency at Duke University before completing a postdoctoral fellowship at Johns Hopkins University. Semenza became the founding director of the Vascular Program at the Johns Hopkins Institute for Cell Engineering following his post-doctorate.

Research

While a post-doctorate researcher at Johns Hopkins, Semenza evaluated gene expression in transgenic animals to determine how this affected the production of erythropoietin (EPO), known to be part of the means for the body to react to hypoxia, or low oxygen levels in the blood. Semenza identified the gene sequences that expressed hypoxia-inducible factors (HIF) proteins. Semenza's work showed that the HIF proteins consisted of two parts; HIF-1β, a stable base to most conditions, and HIF-1α that deteriorated when nominal oxygen levels were present. HIF-1α was further found essential to the EPO production process, as test subjects modified to be deficient in HIF-1α were found to have malformed blood vessels and decreased EPO levels. These HIF proteins were found across multiple test animals. Semenza further found that HIF-1α overproduction could lead to cancer in other subjects.

Semenza's research overlapped with that of William Kaelin and Peter J. Ratcliffe on determining the mechanism of oxygen detection in cells, and how EPO production is regulated by HIF and other factors. This has led to the development of drugs that help regulate these processes for patients with anaemia and kidney failure.

Retractions
In 2011 Semenza retracted from Biochemical Journal one paper coauthored with Naoki Mori (and other collaborators), and in 2022 retracted four papers from PNAS according to Retraction Watch. As of 2022, concerns about the integrity of images in 52 articles coauthored by Semenza have been raised on PubPeer. This has led to investigations by the journals where these articles appeared, resulting in many corrections, retractions and expressions of concern.

Personal life
Semenza is married to Laura Kasch-Semenza, whom he had met while at Johns Hopkins, and who currently operates one of the university's genotyping facilities.

Awards 
 1989: Lucille P. Markey Scholar Award in Biomedical Science, Markey Trust
 1995: Elected Member of the American Society for Clinical Investigation
 2000: E. Mead Johnson Award for Research in Pediatrics, Society for Pediatric Research
 2008: Elected Member of the National Academy of Sciences
 2008: Elected Member of the Association of American Physicians
 2010: Gairdner Foundation International Award
 2012: Elected to the Institute of Medicine
 2012: The Scientific Grand Prize of the Lefoulon-Delalande Foundation
 2012: Stanley J. Korsmeyer Award, American Society for Clinical Investigation
 2014: Wiley Prize
 2016: Albert Lasker Award for Basic Medical Research (with William Kaelin and Peter J. Ratcliffe)
 2019: Nobel Prize in Physiology or Medicine (with William Kaelin and Peter J. Ratcliffe), awarded by the Nobel Prize committee "for their discoveries of how cells sense and adapt to oxygen availability."

References

External links 

  including the Nobel Lecture  on 7 December 2019 Hypoxia-Inducible Factors in Physiology and Medicine

1956 births
Living people
20th-century American physicians
20th-century American scientists
21st-century American physicians
21st-century American scientists
American medical researchers
American Nobel laureates
Duke University alumni
Harvard University alumni
Johns Hopkins University faculty
Members of the United States National Academy of Sciences
Nobel laureates in Physiology or Medicine
People from Flushing, Queens
Perelman School of Medicine at the University of Pennsylvania alumni
Physicians from New York City
Scientists from New York City
Recipients of the Albert Lasker Award for Basic Medical Research
Members of the National Academy of Medicine